Kashka-Suu may refer to:

Populated areas
Kashka-Suu, Aksy, village in Aksy District, Jalal-Abad Province, Kyrgyzstan
Kashka-Suu, Suzak, village in Suzak District, Jalal-Abad Province, Kyrgyzstan
Kashka-Suu, Osh, village in Chong-Alay District, Osh Province, Kyrgyzstan
Kashka-Suu, Alamüdün, village in Alamüdün District, Chuy Province, Kyrgyzstan

Rivers
Kashka Suu (river), right tributary of the Ala-Archa, Kyrgyzstan